Tierra Nueva can refer to these locations
 Tierra Nueva, a municipality in Mexico
 Tierra Nueva (town), a town in San Luis Potosí, Mexico

See also
 Terra Nova (disambiguation)